Hestrie Cloete OIS (née Storbeck; born 26 August 1978) is a former South African professional high jumper. Her foremost achievements were winning two world championships and two silver medals at the Olympic Games.

Career
Cloete was discovered at an age of 13 by her long-time coach Martin Marx, and trained at the Lichtenburg High School early in her career. She was quickly found to have a very strong will, which had given other coaches trouble coaching her. Hestrie Cloete had always put a great significance in maintaining a strong mind, and explained that she finds much of that strength in her faith. In 2003, she was awarded the Order of Ikhamanga in Silver (OIS) by South African president Thabo Mbeki for excellence in her sports performances.

Cloete had somewhat unusual habits, as she was known to smoke about a pack of cigarettes a day, and has also stated she loved fast food. In an attempt to focus before every jump, Cloete characteristically did spin her index fingers around each other, leaned sideways with her upper body and visualised every step of her attempt.

Cloete retired after the 2004 Summer Olympics to focus on her family.

International competitions
Cloete were awarded numerous international achievements. She achieved her high jump personal best of 2.06 m on 31 August 2003, when winning the gold medal under the World Championships in Paris (African record, as of May 2011)

Personal life
Cloete grew up under her maiden name Storbeck in the small railway town of Coligny with her mother Martie and father Willem. She divorced her first husband in 2004 and married Afrikaans singer Jurie Els on 30 September 2005, gave birth to a daughter Chrizette on 5 October 2006 and moved to New Zealand early in 2008. Hestrie and Jurie's son Jason John Els was born in New Zealand on 23 July 2008. The couple resides in Bayview, Auckland on the North Island and Hestrie is a property manager while Jurie still pursues his music career and has a small business Retro Records which sells collectible 2nd hand Pop and Rock vinyl records.

Awards
Order of Ikhamanga (2003) for "exceptional performance in the field of Athletics"

See also
Female two metres club

References

External links

1978 births
Living people
Sportspeople from Germiston
South African female high jumpers
Olympic athletes of South Africa
Olympic silver medalists for South Africa
Athletes (track and field) at the 2000 Summer Olympics
Athletes (track and field) at the 2004 Summer Olympics
Medalists at the 2000 Summer Olympics
Medalists at the 2004 Summer Olympics
Commonwealth Games gold medallists for South Africa
Commonwealth Games medallists in athletics
Athletes (track and field) at the 1998 Commonwealth Games
Athletes (track and field) at the 2002 Commonwealth Games
World Athletics Championships athletes for South Africa
World Athletics Championships medalists
Recipients of the Order of Ikhamanga
Olympic silver medalists in athletics (track and field)
African Games gold medalists for South Africa
African Games medalists in athletics (track and field)
Goodwill Games medalists in athletics
Athletes (track and field) at the 1995 All-Africa Games
Athletes (track and field) at the 1999 All-Africa Games
White South African people
World Athletics Championships winners
Competitors at the 2001 Goodwill Games
Goodwill Games gold medalists in athletics
Medallists at the 2002 Commonwealth Games